Anders Järryd defeated Mike De Palmer 6–3, 6–2 in the final to secure the title.

Seeds
The text in italics indicates the round in which that seed exited the tournament.

  Vincent Van Patten (quarterfinals)
  Hans Simonsson (semifinals)
  Anders Järryd '(champion)
  Mario Martinez (quarterfinals)  Corrado Barazzutti (second round)  Gianluca Rinaldini (first round)  Magnus Tideman (first round)  Mike De Palmer (final)''

Draws

Finals

Section 1

Section 2

External links
 Official results archive (ATP)
 Official results archive (ITF)

Tennis tournaments in Italy
Ancona Open
1982 in Italian tennis